Mu'in may refer to:

Mu'in, Iran, a village in Hamadan Province
Mu'in ad-Din, a given name
Mu'in ad-Din Unur (d. 1149), ruler of Damascus in the mid-12th century
Mu'in al-Madi, Palestinian politician
Muin Bseiso (1926-1984), Egyptian poet

See also
Muin (disambiguation)